Melindea pubescens is a species of leaf beetle of Senegal, described by Gilbert Ernest Bryant in 1941.

References

Eumolpinae
Beetles of Africa
Beetles described in 1941
Insects of West Africa
Endemic fauna of Senegal